Deudorix wardii is a butterfly in the family Lycaenidae. It is found on Madagascar.

References

External links
Die Gross-Schmetterlinge der Erde 13: Die Afrikanischen Tagfalter. Plate XIII 66 d

Butterflies described in 1878
Deudorigini
Butterflies of Africa
Taxa named by Paul Mabille
Deudorix